Bergesida is a village in Grue Municipality in Innlandet county, Norway. The lake Gardsjøen (Grue) lies just south of the village. 

Since 2010, the population and area data for this village area has not been separately tracked by Statistics Norway.

References

Grue, Norway
Villages in Innlandet